Otte is a surname and given name. Notable persons with that name include:

Given name
Otte Brahe (1518–1571), Danish (Scanian) nobleman and statesman
Otte Krumpen (1473–1569), Marshal of Denmark from 1554 to 1567
Otte Rømer (c.1330–1409), Norwegian nobleman, state councilor, and landowner
Otte Rud (1520–1565), Danish admiral during the Northern Seven Years' War
Otte Wallish (1903–1977), Czech-Israeli graphic designer

Surname
Carl Otte (1924–2011), American politician
Carlo Otte (1908–?), German Nazi administrator
Charles Otte (born 1956), American theatre director, producer, designer and educator
Christian Otte (1943 –2005), Belgian painter
Clifford Otte (born 1933), Wisconsin politician
Dan Otte (born 1939), American behavioral ecologist
Eileen Otte (born 1922), American model agency executive
Elise Otté (1818–1903), Anglo-Danish linguist, scholar and historian
Friedrich-Wilhelm Otte (1898–1944), German Wehrmacht general
Gary Otte (1971-2017), American convicted murderer
Hans Otte (1926–2007), German composer, pianist, and poet
Henning Otte (born 1968), German politician
Katharina Otte (born 1987), German field hockey player
Marc Otte (born 1947), Belgian diplomat and politician
Marcel Otte (born 1948), Belgian archaeologist
Martin Otte, German decathlete
Max Otte (born 1964), German economist and investment fund manager
Oscar Otte (born 1993), German tennis player
 (1917–1991), Dutch actress, illustrator, and sculptor
Tarren Otte (born 1984), Australian synchronized swimmer

See also
 Ott (disambiguation)
 Otten (surname)
 Otter

Masculine given names
Patronymic surnames